Brandi Michelle Cossairt (born June 29, 1984) is an American chemist specializing in synthetic inorganic and materials chemistry. She is an Associate Professor of Chemistry at University of Washington.

Personal life and education 
Brandi Cossairt was born and raised in Miami, Florida. She began working in the laboratory of Anthony J. Hynes at the University of Miami Rosenstiel School of Marine and Atmospheric Science while still in high school. She is a first-generation college graduate, having obtained her B.S. in chemistry from the California Institute of Technology in 2006. During her undergraduate degree, Cossairt worked with Jonas C. Peters on electrocatalytic hydrogen evolution with a cobaloxime complex. Cossairt then pursued a graduate degree in inorganic chemistry at the Massachusetts Institute of Technology, where, under the mentorship of Christopher C. Cummins, she received her PhD in 2010. Her doctoral work focused on the niobium-mediated synthesis of phosphorus-rich molecules, such as AsP3. Her academic career next took her to New York, where she joined Columbia University as a National Institutes of Health NRSA Postdoctoral Fellow with Jonathan S. Owen between 2010 and 2012.

Research 
Cossairt moved to Seattle in 2012 to begin her independent research career as an Assistant Professor in the Department of Chemistry at the University of Washington. Cossairt leads a synthetic inorganic chemistry research group working primarily in colloidal nanoscience. Cossairt's team works to prepare new molecular precursors, develop new synthetic methodologies, and explore the details of complex reaction mechanisms. In particular, her team has pioneered new synthetic strategies to access indium phosphide quantum dots. InP quantum dots have emerged as a class of phosphors for wide color gamut displays and energy-efficient solid-state lighting applications.

Recognition 
 2018 National Fresenius Award (American Chemical Society, sponsored by Phi Lambda Upsilon)
 2017 Camille Dreyfus Teacher Scholar Award (Camille and Henry Dreyfus Foundation)
 2016 NSF CAREER Award
 2015 Packard Fellowship for Science and Engineering (David and Lucile Packard Foundation)
 2015 Sloan Research Fellowship (Alfred P. Sloan Foundation)
 2015 Seattle AWIS Award for Early Career Achievement

Organizations 
 Associate Editor at the ACS journal Inorganic Chemistry.
 Co-founder (along with Jillian Dempsey, UNC Chapel Hill) of the Chemistry Women Mentorship Network, a national network of women in chemistry to provide support, encouragement and mentorship for young women considering continuing their education or pursuing careers in academia.

References 

1984 births
Living people
American women chemists
Inorganic chemists
California Institute of Technology alumni
Massachusetts Institute of Technology School of Science alumni
University of Washington faculty
American women academics
21st-century American women